Live 1980/86 is a Joe Jackson double live album, released in May 1988. It was recorded during the 1980 Beat Crazy tour, the 1982-83 Night and Day tour, the 1984 Body & Soul tour, and the 1986 Big World tour. Notably, the album contains three different versions of "Is She Really Going Out with Him?"

Track listing 
All songs written and arranged by Joe Jackson, except where noted.

Personnel 
 Musicians 
 Joe Jackson - piano, synthesizer, organ, alto saxophone, harmonica, vocals
-- Performing on the Beat Crazy tour
 Graham Maby – bass, vocals
 Gary Sanford – guitar, vocals
 David Houghton – drums, vocals
-- Performing on the Night & Day tour
 Graham Maby – bass, vocals
 Joy Askew – keyboards, vocals, percussion on "Cancer"
 Ed Roynesdal – keyboards, vocals, percussion on "Cancer"
 Sue Hadjopoulos – percussion, vocals
 Larry Tolfree – drums, percussion
-- Performing on the Body & Soul tour
 Graham Maby – bass, vocals, tambourine
 Ed Roynesdal – keyboards, violin
 Vinnie Zummo – guitar, accordion, synthesizer on "Real Men", organ on "Slow Song"
 Tony Aiello – saxophones, piccolo, vocals
 Michael Morreale – trumpet, synthesizer on "Slow Song"
 Gary Burke – drums
-- Performing on the Big World tour
 Gary Burke – drums
 Rick Ford – bass, vocals
 Vinnie Zummo – guitar on "Breaking Us In Two" and "Steppin' Out"
 Tom Teeley – guitar, vocals on "It's Different For Girls", "You Can't Get What You Want" and "Jumpin' Jive"

 Production
 Joe Jackson - arrangements, producer
 David Kershenbaum - producer
 Nigel Walker - recording engineer
 Caroline Orme - assistant recording engineer

Charts

Weekly charts

Year-end charts

References

External links 
 Live 1980/86 album information at The Joe Jackson Archive

Joe Jackson (musician) live albums
1988 live albums
Albums produced by David Kershenbaum
A&M Records live albums